Eric Mark Palmqvist (born 18 October 1970) is a Swedish politician. He is currently a Sweden Democratic member of the Swedish Riksdag for Norrbotten. Before becoming a politician he worked as a truck driver.

He was also elected as Member of the Riksdag in September 2022.

References 

Living people
1970 births
Members of the Riksdag from the Sweden Democrats
Members of the Riksdag 2018–2022
Members of the Riksdag 2022–2026
21st-century Swedish politicians
Politicians from Malmö